Boško Đorđević (also transliterated Boško Djordjević; born 22 August 1953) is a retired Serbian football player. He is mainly known for spending five and a half seasons with FK Partizan between 1974 and the winter of 1979, with whom he won the 1975–76, 1977–78 Yugoslav First League and Mitropa Cup in 1978.

Along with Dušan Savić, Đorđević was also joint top scorer of the league in the 1974–75 season with 20 goals in 29 league appearances, although Partizan finished that season sixth, with 12 points behind champions Hajduk Split.

After leaving Partizan in the winter break of the 1979–80 season, Đorđević had a brief spell with FK Rad in the Yugoslav Second League before moving abroad and joining 2. Fußball-Bundesliga side SG Union Solingen. He only appeared in 10 league matches for Solingen in the following two seasons, before retiring in 1983.

External links
 
 

1953 births
Living people
Serbian footballers
Yugoslav footballers
Association football forwards
FK Partizan players
FK Rad players
SG Union Solingen players
Yugoslav First League players
2. Bundesliga players
Serbian expatriate footballers
Expatriate footballers in Germany